Zamzam University of Science and Technology (ZUST) is a Somali higher education institution founded in 2013 for the purpose of excelling human capacity needed in the nation. The university has main campus in Mogadishu, Somalia and also has  campuses in the cities of Baidoa and Jowhar.

History 
In 2012, Zamzam foundation started agricultural training school declared its purpose to be “rebuilding food production system of the country and accelerate its yield, while promoting income generation for low-income families”. The School conducted 22 training programs during that period. Agricultural training school became Zamzam University of Science & Technology (ZUST) in 2013.

(ZUST) served a platform that can support the production of human capacity and reduce poverty and hunger. In 2013, the university offered its first graduate-level courses. The faculty of agriculture opened in 2014, followed in 2015 by the faculty of Medicine. Currently the ZUST has six faculties and center for graduate studies.  The permanent  campus of the university is located in  the KM11  weydoow  Mogadishu and is began operations on 4 September 2016.

Academics

Centers

Research and Innovation Center (RIC)

Center for Sustainable Agriculture and Environmental Studies (SAES)

Center for Poultry Production

Zamzam Techno Park

Notable former and current administrators 

 Prof . Dr. Ahmed Mumin Warfa

See also 

 List of universities in Somalia

References

External links 

Universities in Somalia